The Grande Tête de l'Obiou (or simply  l'Obiou) is a mountain in the French Prealps belonging to the French department of Isère. It is the highest peak of the Dévoluy Mountains and of the Dauphiné Prealps and the seventh most prominent summit of metropolitan France.

Geography 
Administratively the mountain is divided between the French communes of Cordéac (NE slopes) and Monestier-d'Ambel (SW slopes).

Access to the summit
The easiest route for the summit starts from Baumes hut and ascends the southern slopes of the mountain through the Faïsses pass and the Obiou pass (l'Épaule).

See also 
List of French mountains by prominence

References

Maps
 French  official cartography (Institut géographique national - IGN); on-line version:  www.geoportail.fr

Bibliography 
 Claude Péquignot, Sa Majesté l'Obiou, 2004
 Louis-Edmond Hamelin, L'Obiou entre Dieu et diable, 1990, extraits
 Fabienne Gilbertas, 60 ans, après l'accident de l'Obiou. Recueil de témoignages des sauveteurs, le 60ème anniversaire de la catastrophe, 2010

Obiou
Obiou
Obiou
Dauphiné Prealps